The Crab Orchard Wilderness is a  parcel of land listed as a Wilderness Area of the United States.  It is located within the Crab Orchard National Wildlife Refuge in Williamson, Union, and Jackson counties in Illinois.

Second-growth wilderness
As with other wilderness areas in southern Illinois, the Crab Orchard Wilderness is made of second-growth forested areas that were used, until the land condemnations of the 1930s, as agriculture and pasture land.  The United States Fish and Wildlife Service manages the wilderness.  
 
The Crab Orchard Wilderness is a roadless parcel of land within a national wildlife refuge. Together with the adjacent Panther Den Wilderness, it forms part of the southern shore of Devils Kitchen Lake. 

The Crab Orchard Wilderness is accessible by several paved highways.  The nearest divided highway is Interstate 57, which passes through the nearby city of Marion, Illinois.

References
    

IUCN Category Ib
Protected areas established in 1990
1990 establishments in Illinois
Protected areas of Jackson County, Illinois
Protected areas of Union County, Illinois
Protected areas of Williamson County, Illinois
Wilderness areas of Illinois